Calopogon tuberosus, the tuberous grass pink, is an orchid native to eastern North America.

Distribution
In the United States, it occurs from as far southwest as Texas and Oklahoma and southeast to the Florida Everglades to as far northeast as Maine and as far northwest as Minnesota. In Canada, it is found in all provinces from Newfoundland to Manitoba. It also is found in St. Pierre & Miquelon, Cuba and the Bahamas.

Subspecies
Calopogon tuberosus var. simpsonii (Small) Magrath – southern Florida
Calopogon tuberosus var. tuberosus – from Texas to Florida, north to Manitoba and Nova Scotia, also Cuba and Bahamas

Conservation status
It is listed as "G5 - Secure" under the NatureServe conservation status system. However it is listed as an endangered species by the states of Illinois, Kentucky, and Maryland, and as exploitably vulnerable by New York.

References

External links 
 Go Orchids, North American Orchids Conservation Center
 Calopogon tuberosus gallery link
 Lady Bird Johnson Wildflower Center, University of Texas
 Orchids of Wisconsin
 Florida's Native and Naturalized Orchids
 
 Missouri Plants, photo
 Paul Smith's College, College of the Adirondacks, Visitor's Interpretive Center
 Ontario Wildflowers
 

tuberosus
Orchids of the United States
Orchids of the Caribbean
Orchids of Canada
Orchids of Cuba
Orchids of Florida
Orchids of Kentucky
Orchids of Maryland
Flora of Eastern Canada
Flora of the Southeastern United States
Flora of the Northeastern United States
Flora of the North-Central United States
Flora of the Bahamas
Flora of Manitoba
Flora of Texas
Plants described in 1753
Taxa named by Carl Linnaeus
NatureServe secure species